The Gandantegchinlen Monastery (Gandantegchinlen khiid, short name: Gandan ) is a Mongolian Buddhist monastery in the Mongolian capital of Ulaanbaatar that has been restored and revitalized since 1990. The Tibetan name translates to the "Great Place of Complete Joy". It currently has over 150 monks in residence. It features a 26.5-meter-high statue of Avalokiteśvara. It came under state protection in 1994.

History

The monastery was constructed by order of the 5th Jebtsundamba Khutuktu in 1809. The first temple was the Gungaachoilin Datsan. Only one wooden pillar remains from this temple. In 1838, the Gandantegchenlin Temple was built along with the private residence of the Jebtsundamba Khutuktu. The 13th Dalai Lama stayed in the residence in 1904. In 1840, the Vajradhara Temple was built. In 1869, the Zuu Temple was built. In 1913, the tall Avalokiteśvara temple was built. In 1925, the temple for keeping the remains of the 8th Jebtsundamba Khutuktu was built. It is now the monastery library.

In the 1930s, the Communist government of Mongolia, under the leadership of Khorloogiin Choibalsan and under the influence of Joseph Stalin, destroyed all but a few monasteries and killed more than 15,000 lamas.

Gandantegchinlen Khiid monastery, having escaped this mass destruction, was closed in 1938, but then reopened in 1944 and was allowed to continue as the only functioning Buddhist monastery, under a skeleton staff, as a token homage to traditional Mongolian culture and religion.  With the end of Marxism in Mongolia in 1990, restrictions on worship were lifted.

Statue
The original statue, made of copper, was built after appeals to the Mongolian public; its intent was to restore the sight of the 8th Jebtsundamba, also known as Bogd Khan), who had claimed the title of Emperor of Mongolia. The statue was built by Bogd Javzandamba's principal minister, Chin Wan Khanddorj.  Russian troops dismantled the original statue in 1938.  After the end of the Soviet era, the statue of Avalokiteśvara was rebuilt in 1996, funded by donations by the Mongolian people.  It features 2,286 precious stones and is gilded with gold leaf.

Since 1992, the Supreme Leader of the Centre of All Mongolian Buddhists and Abbot of Gandantegchinlen Monastery has been Lama Gabju Choijamts Demberel.

The monastery is surrounded by the Gandan ger suburb.

See also
 Buddhism in Mongolia

References

External links

Official website of the Gandan Monastery
Photos of monastery 
Article
Photos
Article on Ulaanbaatar with a section on the monastery
Buddhism in Mongolia After 1990
An interview with Tibetologist Glenn H. Mullin

Buddhism in Ulaanbaatar
Buddhist monasteries in Mongolia
Buildings and structures in Ulaanbaatar
Tibetan Buddhism in Mongolia
Tibetan Buddhist monasteries